Daisy Cordell was a British actress of the silent era. She was born in Hong Kong and died in Tunbridge Wells, Kent, England. She was married to the actor Evelyn Roberts.

Selected filmography
 The Harbour Lights (1914)
 In the Ranks (1914)
 The Coal King (1915)
 A Rogue's Wife (1915)
 Master and Man (1915)
 The Romany Rye (1915)
 Disraeli (1916)
 The Life of a London Actress (1919)

References

External links

 

Year of birth unknown
Year of death unknown
English film actresses
English silent film actresses
20th-century English actresses